Gaadhoo (Dhivehi: ގާދޫ) is one of the inhabited islands of Laamu Atoll.

Geography

Demography

References

Islands of the Maldives